William Buzaglo was an 18th-century self-proclaimed English inventor. He claimed to have invented a new plan of stoves to heat large public buildings, which was the first of his claims. He later practised medicine and claimed a cure for gout through regular muscular exercise alone. His method seems to have been something similar to modern physiotherapy or simple massage, but during his time he was generally considered a quack, mainly because of the "aboundingly" self-praising advertisements that he made for himself. His style of advertisement was humorously parodied by Captain Grose, an English draughtsman and lexicographer, with a caricature in a handbill titled "Patent Exercise, or Les Caprices de la Goutte". Buzaglo died in London in 1788.

Notes

References

External links
 
 Lysons, Environs of London, iii. 479

1780 deaths
English Jews
Year of birth unknown